The Baxter Building is a fictional 35-story office building appearing in American comic books published by Marvel Comics. Created by Stan Lee and Jack Kirby, the building first appeared in Fantastic Four #3 (March 1962). The construction is depicted in Manhattan, and its five upper floors house the Fantastic Four's headquarters.

Publication history
The Baxter Building first appeared in Fantastic Four #3 (March 1962) and was created by Stan Lee and Jack Kirby. The Baxter Building was the first comic-book superhero lair to be well known to the general public in the fictional world.

The Baxter Building is destroyed in Fantastic Four #278 (May 1985), written and drawn by John Byrne. Explaining why he chose to destroy the iconic structure, Byrne said, "The FF’s HQ building had long been established as 35 stories in height. Quite impressive in 1962, but not so much in 1980, when I came to the book. It didn’t seem like I could just start referring to the building as taller than all those previous stories had made it, so I decided on something a wee bit more dramatic."

Fictional description
Located at 42nd Street and Madison Avenue in New York City, it had been built in 1949 by the Leland Baxter Paper Company. The top five floors of the 35-story building were purchased outright by the Fantastic Four.

The building's steel frame construction utilized the first application of "K bracing" in the world and is one of the strongest structures of its kind. The Baxter Building is located a few city blocks from the United Nations Building. Reed Richards has applied for many land-use zone variations to allow massive reconstruction of the top five floors for the installation of a heavily silenced silo, with a muffled rocket.

The design of the headquarters of the Fantastic Four is along strictly utilitarian lines, except for apartments and public areas. All aspects of the design are constantly being improved, including security. Solid, armored, exterior walls are also mirror-clad and are indistinguishable from transparent sections.

The top five sections of the Baxter Building are completely airtight; all doors are airlocks. Complete environmental support (including atmosphere) is provided by the area between elevators 2, 3, and 4 on all floors. The building's steel-alloy framework is rigid enough to be stood on one corner and not collapse (It was suggested that the Baxter Building did not collapse under its own weight due to the use of tactile telekinesis by Gladiator of the Shi'ar Imperial Guard. Reed himself stated that even with the reinforced structure, it should not be possible otherwise.).

The buffer-zone is the interface between the top five floors and the lower levels. It provides a rapid-disconnect between upper and lower segments of building. It contains an array of large oil-rams to dampen any oscillations between the five upper levels and the base of the building. The buffer-zone contains some support equipment for the upper levels, but mostly it is the "mechanical floor", which provides heating, ventilation, air-conditioning and elevator support equipment for the lower 30 stories.

Ownership
A running joke for years in the title was that the landlord Walter Collins was initially eager to rent out to a superhero team for the publicity and prestige, but he soon regretted his decision as the building became a constant target for numerous attacks by supervillains starting with Fantastic Four #6 in which Doctor Doom launched the entire building into outer space. The attacks made things difficult not only for the Four, but for the other tenants in the lower floors as well. Eventually, Reed Richards decided to invoke a clause of the rental agreement and bought the entire building to avoid eviction.

Iterations
Eventually, the building was destroyed by Doctor Doom's adopted son Kristoff Vernard, who shot it into space and exploded it in a bid to murder the Fantastic Four. It was replaced by Four Freedoms Plaza, built upon the same site. After the Fantastic Four and other costumed heroes were presumed dead in the wake of their battle with Onslaught, Four Freedoms Plaza was stripped clean of all the FF's equipment by Vernard and Reed Richards' father Nathaniel, who sent it into the Negative Zone to keep it out of the hands of the United States military.

Upon their return, the Fantastic Four could not move back into Four Freedoms Plaza, as it had been destroyed by the Thunderbolts, shortly after the revelation that they were actually the Avengers' longtime foes, the Masters of Evil. Thus, the Fantastic Four moved into a retrofitted warehouse along the Hudson River which they named Pier 4. The warehouse was destroyed during a battle with Diablo, after which the team received a new Baxter Building, courtesy of Reed's former professor Noah Baxter. This Baxter Building was constructed in Earth's orbit and teleported into the vacant lot formerly occupied by the original Baxter Building and Four Freedoms Plaza. The current Baxter Building's ground floor is used as a Fantastic Four gift shop and museum open to the public.

In the aftermath of the collapse of the multiverse, the Fantastic Four have disbanded as the Richards' family have gone on to reconstruct the multiverse, leaving the Thing to join the Guardians of the Galaxy, while the Torch is working as an ambassador for the Inhumans and a member of the Avengers Unity Squad. As a result, the deserted Baxter Building was up for auction, until it was purchased to serve as the temporary headquarters of Parker Industries, much to the initial dismay of the Human Torch. However, Peter Parker explained to the Torch that he outbid Alchemax, Hammer Industries, and Roxxon for the ownership of the building simply to keep it out of their hands, and will give the Baxter Building back when the Fantastic Four reunites. Witnessing a large sculpture of the FF in the entrance hall that was created by Alicia Masters, the Torch reflects that he is glad that the building is staying with family. But when Parker Industries was destroyed during Secret Empire, it was sold out to an anonymous buyer and is currently the headquarters of The Fantastix.

Reception

Accolades 

 In 2019, CBR.com ranked the Baxter Building 9th in their "10 Most Iconic Superhero Hideouts In Marvel Comics" list.
 In 2020, CBR.com ranked the Baxter Building 7th in their "10 Best Secret Lairs In Marvel Comics" list and 10th in their "Avengers 10 Best Headquarters" list.

Other fictional versions

1602
In the Marvel 1602 miniseries The Fantastick Four, Sir Richard Reed and Susan Storm are renting a manor house from Lord Baxter. Sir Richard has equipped it with an observatory and chemical laboratory.

Old Man Quill
In the Old Man Logan timeline, the Baxter Building is used as a missile, ultimately killing Loki in the Midwest of America. The smashed remnants of the building still contain many secrets, which attract people from entirely other galaxies. Peter Quill hopes to use these secrets to save what is left of the galaxy.

Spider-Verse
In the Spider-Verse storyline, The Baxter Building of Earth-802 is the main office of Jennix of the Inheritors and houses their cloning facility (which they use to resurrect themselves in case of death). The universe's version of the Human Torch is the head of security. The Scarlet Spiders infiltrated the building and became the site of battle with Jennix in which Ben Reilly sacrificed his life to destroy the building ending the Inheritors' only working cloning facility.

Ultimate Marvel
In the Ultimate Marvel universe, the Baxter Foundation is a US government think tank, where exceptionally gifted children are offered government positions to use their intelligence to serve their country. The government contacted Reed Richards because of his experiments in teleportation; they had found small toy cars that he had sent into the N-Zone. At the Baxter Building, Reed meets Professor Franklin Storm; Storm's two children, Susan and Johnny; as well as Victor Van Damme (Dr. Doom). The building is overseen by General "Thunderbolt" Ross. Security duties are overseen by the soldier Willie Lumpkin.

In this version, the Mole Man is originally Dr. Molekevic, a former employee of the Baxter Building. His service is terminated when his projects are deemed "unethical".

After the accident that gave the Fantastic Four their powers, the children who were not altered were moved to another facility in Oregon. The Baxter Building then becomes the FF's headquarters.

The Baxter Building also appears in Ultimate Iron Man, volume 1, issues 4-5.

In other media

Television
 The Fantastic Four cartoon series from the 1960s featured the Baxter Building as the group's headquarters.
 The Baxter Building appears in the 1990s Fantastic Four TV series. In this cartoon, the disgruntled landlord was replaced by a landlady named Lavina Forbes (voiced by Stan Lee's wife Joan Lee). By Season 2, it was replaced by Four Freedoms Plaza as their home base after it was destroyed in the episode "And a Blind Man Shall Lead Them."
 The Baxter Building appears in Fantastic Four: World's Greatest Heroes. In this version (Earth-135263), the building appears to be an Art Deco inspired 30-40 story building with an additional tower taller than the original building built on the roof. This tower serves as Reed Richard's Laboratory, storage, training and headquarters of the team. The presence of interdimensional threats and supervillain attacks has detracted potential tenants from the building, leaving the majority of it vacant yet it seems to suffer no financial stress. In the show, the landlady is Courtney Bonner-Davis (voiced by Laura Drummond). The building has both been launched into space and submerged underground.
 The Baxter Building appears in several The Avengers: Earth's Mightiest Heroes episodes. In "The Man Who Stole Tomorrow", "Ravonna" is kept alive in stasis at the Baxter Building and a version of "H.E.R.B.I.E." is seen. In "The Private War of Doctor Doom", the Baxter Building is invaded by Doctor Doom. In "Secret Invasion", the "Skrull" temporarily transport the Baxter Building to another dimension. The Baxter Building is first referenced in the episode "Masters of Evil", which references a Baxter building tenant in the a headline that reads "Replaced By Aliens... Baxter Tenant Speaks". The Baxter Building is also where the portal to the "Negative Zone" prison is located in the show.   
 The Baxter Building appears in the Hulk and the Agents of S.M.A.S.H. episode "The Collector", where The Thing hosts a poker game against Hulk, Red Hulk, and She-Hulk, before being captured by The Collector. In "Into the Negative Zone", Hulk traveled to the Baxter Building in New York to use the Fantastic Four's Negative Zone portal.

Film
 It appeared in the 2005 Fantastic Four film, being displayed as an art-deco apartment block, where Reed Richards (Ioan Gruffudd) had rented the entire top floor and turned it into a laboratory/home. Victor Von Doom (Julian McMahon) referenced many times that he couldn't pay the bills to keep the lights running. Vancouver's Marine Building was selected as the filming location for the Baxter Building due to its art deco appearance.
 In the 2007 film Fantastic Four: Rise of the Silver Surfer, the Baxter Building roof was the setting for Reed Richards and Susan Storm's wedding. To reflect the Fantastic Four's increased prosperity, the depiction of the Baxter Building was updated. According to screenwriter Don Payne, "The Baxter Building, because they're more successful and making more money, has been refurbished. So it's not as grungy, more high tech."
 In the 2015 reboot Fantastic Four film, the Baxter Building is renamed the Baxter Institute, and is depicted as a government funded think tank for scientific youngsters, founded by Franklin Storm. After successfully demonstrating teleportation engineer, an amazed Franklin invites Reed to the Baxter (along with daughter Sue and Victor von Doom) to help finish the institute's long-awaited Quantum Gate, which would eventually lead to them getting their abilities via Planet Zero.

Video games

 The Baxter Building appears in Spider-Man and Venom: Maximum Carnage. Spider-Man and Venom break into the Baxter Building while the Fantastic Four are out of town to retrieve Reed Richards' sonic gun to fight Carnage.
 The Baxter Building appears as one of the game world zones called Baxter Plaza in Marvel Super Hero Squad Online, featuring several Fantastic Four themed locations such as a dance club based on Johnny Storm, a pizza restaurant based on The Thing, a machine to turn players invisible based on The Invisible Woman, and a rocket ship four player flight movement spot based on Reed Richards.
 The Baxter Building appears in Spider-Man. Spider-Man can go to the Baxter Building in the second level, where he can pick up a copy of Amazing Spider-Man #1 (featuring the FF). If "What If" mode is turned on, Johnny will appear and explain that he and the other three are fighting Mole Man and flies off.
 The Baxter Building appears in Ultimate Spider-Man. The player can meet Johnny Storm at the top of the Baxter Building for a race.
 The Baxter Building appears as a map in the Fantastic Four video game based on the 2005 film.
 The Baxter Building can be seen in the Human Torch's loading screen in Marvel: Ultimate Alliance as well as earlier arts for the game. When Weasel was looking for someplace to hide from S.H.I.E.L.D., Hank Pym mentions to the players that there might be S.H.I.E.L.D. Soldiers there since he mentions that Reed Richards tends to work with S.H.I.E.L.D.
 The Baxter Building appears in The Incredible Hulk as a landmark and a destructible building.
 The Baxter Building appears in Spider-Man: Web of Shadows where, on the roof, the player can pick up spider collectibles in the shape of 4 and once the collectibles are collected, number 4 is imprinted on the landing bay.
 The Baxter Building appears in the background of The Daily Bugle stage in Marvel vs. Capcom 3.
 The Baxter Building appears as a level in Lego Marvel Super Heroes.
 The Baxter Building appears in the digital collectable card game Marvel Snap.

Commercial depictions
 The Baxter Building is included among fictional locations depicted in a “virtual tour” of New York City, New York Skyride.
 The Baxter building appears in Universal's Islands of Adventure theme park, located on "Marvel Super Hero Island."

See also
Avengers Mansion
Four Freedoms Plaza
X-Mansion

References

Fantastic Four
Fictional buildings and structures originating in comic books
Fictional elements introduced in 1962
Marvel Comics locations